The Life of Charlotte Brontë is the posthumous biography of Charlotte Brontë by fellow novelist Elizabeth Gaskell. 
The first edition was published in 1857 by Smith, Elder & Co. A major source was the hundreds of letters sent by Brontë to her lifelong friend Ellen Nussey.

Gaskell had to deal with rather sensitive issues, toning down some of her material: in the case of her description of the Clergy Daughters' School, attended by Charlotte and her sisters, this was to avoid legal action from the Rev. William Carus Wilson, the founder of the school. The published text does not go so far as to blame him for the deaths of two Brontë sisters, but even so the Carus Wilson family published a rebuttal with the title "A refutation of the statements in 'The life of Charlotte Bronte,' regarding the Casterton Clergy Daughters' School, when at Cowan Bridge".

Although quite frank in many places, Gaskell suppressed details of Charlotte's love for Constantin Héger, a married man, on the grounds that it would be too great an affront to contemporary morals and a possible source of distress to Charlotte's still-living friends, father Patrick Brontë and husband.
She also suppressed any reference to Charlotte's romance with George Smith, her publisher, who was also publishing the biography.

In 2017, The Guardian named The Life of Charlotte Brontë one of the 100 best nonfiction books of all time.

Notes

References
Lane, Margaret. The Brontë Story: A reconsideration of Mrs. Gaskell's Life of Charlotte Brontë. 1953.

External links
 Complete text
 

Non-fiction works by Elizabeth Gaskell
Biographies about writers
1857 books
Bronte, Charlotte